Munich St.-Martin-Straße station is a railway station in Munich, Germany, spanning the street bearing the same name. It is on the Munich East–Deisenhofen railway and is served by lines S 3 and S 7 of the Munich S-Bahn. It is in close proximity to the southwest Europe headquarters of Nokia Siemens Networks in Munich.

References

External links

St.-Martin-Straße
St.-Martin-Straße